Asya Miller Lapper (born October 16, 1979) is a five-time Paralympic medalist, with four of her medals coming in goalball. Miller was nominated for an ESPY Award in 2009.

Miller made her Paralympic debut in 2000 and won a bronze medal for discus at the Sydney Paralympic Games. In goalball, Miller and teammate Lisa Czechowski competed in their sixth Paralympics together at the 2020 Tokyo Paralympic Games. Together they have won four Paralympic medals, including gold at the 2008 Beijing Paralympic Games.

Her visual impairment is caused by Stargardt disease. She has also competed in various throwing events, like discus, besides goalball. Her wife is fellow goalballer Jen Armbruster.

See also 
 United States women's national goalball team
 2012 Summer Paralympics roster
 2016 Summer Paralympics roster
 2020 Summer Paralympics roster

References

External links 
 
 

1979 births
Living people
Female goalball players
Paralympic track and field athletes of the United States
Paralympic goalball players of the United States
Paralympic gold medalists for the United States
Paralympic silver medalists for the United States
Paralympic bronze medalists for the United States
Paralympic medalists in athletics (track and field)
Athletes (track and field) at the 2000 Summer Paralympics
Goalball players at the 2004 Summer Paralympics
Goalball players at the 2008 Summer Paralympics
Goalball players at the 2012 Summer Paralympics
Goalball players at the 2016 Summer Paralympics
Medalists at the 2000 Summer Paralympics
Medalists at the 2004 Summer Paralympics
Medalists at the 2008 Summer Paralympics
Medalists at the 2016 Summer Paralympics
Medalists at the 2011 Parapan American Games
Medalists at the 2015 Parapan American Games
People from Lapeer, Michigan
Sportspeople from Metro Detroit
LGBT people from Michigan
American LGBT sportspeople
LGBT track and field athletes
LGBT goalball players
Lesbian sportswomen
Goalball players at the 2020 Summer Paralympics
21st-century LGBT people
American female discus throwers